Obreja Veche is a commune in Fălești District, Moldova. It is composed of two villages, Obreja Nouă and Obreja Veche.

Notable people
 Ion Văluță

References

Communes of Fălești District